Oenomys is a genus of African rodents.  Known as rufous-nosed rats or rusty-nosed rats, they occur from Sierra Leone east to Ethiopia and as far south as northern Angola. The  nose is reddish, or at least the cheeks, which suggested both the English and scientific names (oeno- means "wine-colored" and -mys denotes a mouselike animal).

Genus Oenomys - rufous-nosed rats
Common rufous-nosed rat, Oenomys hypoxanthus (Pucheran, 1855)
Oenomys hypoxanthus albiventris (Eisentraut, 1968)
Ghana rufous-nosed rat, Oenomys ornatus (Thomas, 1911)Oenomys tiercelini''

 
Rodent genera
Taxa named by Oldfield Thomas